Selby is a market town and civil parish in the Selby District of North Yorkshire, England,  south of York on the River Ouse. In the 2021 UK Census, it had a population recorded at 19,760.

The town was historically part of the West Riding of Yorkshire until 1974.

Selby once had a large shipbuilding industry, and was an important port on the Selby Canal which brought trade from Leeds.

History

Foundation
The town's origins date from the establishment of a Viking settlement on the banks of the River Ouse. Archaeological investigations in Selby have revealed extensive remains, including waterlogged deposits in the core of the town dating from the Roman period onwards. It is believed that Selby originated as a settlement called Seletun which was referred to in the Anglo-Saxon Chronicle of AD 779.

The place-name 'Selby' is first attested in a Yorkshire charter , where it appears as Seleby. It appears as Selbi . The name is thought to be a Scandinavian form of Seletun, meaning 'sallow tree settlement'.

Development
The town of Selby is on the main route north from the Midlands and is the traditional birthplace of King Henry I, fourth son of William the Conqueror, in 1068/69; the connection is supported by William and his wife Matilda's unique joint charter of Selby Abbey, far to the north of their usual circuit of activities, which was founded for Benedict of Auxerre in 1069 and subsequently supported by the de Lacy family. King Henry I is reputed to have been born there in either 1068 or 1069. A notable feature of the abbey is the 14th-century Washington Window, featuring the heraldic arms of the ancestors of George Washington, the first president of the United States. The design is often cited as an influence for the Stars and Stripes flag.

It is said that the abbey was founded when Benedict saw three swans on a lake in Selby, and he saw it as a sign of the Father, Son and Holy Ghost, and that is why the official crest of Selby Abbey is three swans. Selby Abbey was closed in 1539 as part of the Dissolution of the Monasteries under Henry VIII and the majority of the buildings have since been demolished. The central nave of the abbey church survived and in 1618 it became the parish church of Selby.

During the English Civil War, the Royalist garrison of Selby was captured by Parliamentarians in the Battle of Selby on 11 April 1644. There are other historical sites, such as the cholera burial ground on the north side of the abbey, the market cross and the local school, Selby High School. The Market Place has existed since the early 14th century when the market was moved away from the monastery churchyard. The Crescent which curves eastwards from James Street was planned in the early 19th century by a local man, John Audus, after seeing Lansdown Crescent in Bath, Somerset.

Since 2000
Selby is expanding to become a larger town. New houses and shops are being built on the present town's outskirts with the expansion of the town stretching as far as the bypass, although this has resulted in the loss of some trade from the town centre. Meanwhile, the riverfront area is being revamped with modern housing and fashionable flats.

Rail crash

The 2001 Great Heck rail crash is also often referred to as the Selby rail crash. It happened a few miles south of Selby, at the village of Great Heck near the M62 motorway, and Selby was the closest major town to the accident site. On 28 February 2001, a vehicle crashed off the M62 down an embankment on to a railway track, where it was struck by a passenger train heading to London. The accident was then compounded by a second collision involving an oncoming goods train.

Hobson murders
Selby and its surrounding area came to national prominence, once again, through another tragedy on 18 July 2004, this time through four exceptionally violent murders carried out by former refuse collector Mark Hobson. Hobson, 34 at the time, killed his girlfriend Claire Sanderson, 27, and her sister Diane at a flat in the nearby village of Camblesforth. He subsequently murdered an elderly couple, James and Joan Britton, at their home in the village of Strensall, near York. Hobson was later sentenced to life imprisonment with the trial judge recommending that he should never be released; the High Court later agreed with this recommendation.

Governance

At the lowest level of governance is Selby Town Council. The town is divided into three electoral wards, north, south and west, each represented by six councillors. These 17 councillors are responsible for burial grounds, allotments, play areas and some street lighting. Elections to the town council are held every four years. The Mayor of Selby is elected annually by the members of the town council.

At district level the town is part of the Selby District Council area. The town is represented by seven councillors on the District Council, two each for the west and south wards and three for the north ward.
On the North Yorkshire County Council the town is part of the Selby Barlby county division which elects two representatives to the county council.
In the United Kingdom Parliament Selby formed part of the Selby constituency until the 2010 general election, when it became part of the new seat of Selby and Ainsty. It is represented by Conservative MP Nigel Adams.

Geography
Selby lies on the tidal River Ouse in a natural area of Yorkshire known as the Humberhead Levels. The main roads which cross at Selby are the A63 from Leeds to Hull and the A19 from Doncaster to York, though the A19 and A63 no longer meet in Selby itself since the opening of the Selby Bypass in 2004. The River Ouse is navigable upstream as far as York so the old toll bridge by which the A63 crossed the river at Selby had to allow for this. For many years the swing bridge in Selby was a notorious local bottleneck but since the opening of the Selby bypass congestion in the town has been relieved.

The importance of Selby as a market town has declined in recent decades and its short lived prominence as the centre of the Selby Coalfield has also waned. Selby is close in proximity to both York and Leeds. Its popularity as a tourist destination, due to Selby Abbey, has led to a large amount of development and renovation in the town and surrounding area.

The residential areas of Selby have also been subject to expansion and development. A significant development called Staynor Hall continues to be developed on the South East of the town, with other developments in the Holmes Lane area, and around the villages of Brayton, Barlby and Thorpe Willoughby. More have been built at various points along the riverfront, the result of an ongoing project to improve an area that had been largely derelict since the decline of the shipbuilding industry.

Floods
In recent years there have been serious flood problems in Selby and the adjoining village of Barlby. The threat in the Barlby area has been alleviated to some extent by work on improved, better flood barriers following the major flood of November 2000.

Religion

Selby Abbey is one of the largest parish churches in Britain and is larger than several cathedrals.

There are various other Christian churches in the town that offer community and differing styles of worship: King's Church, St Mary's Roman Catholic Church, Portholme Methodist / URC Church, and St James' Church. Edge Community was founded in 2009 for the Flaxley Road community, and The Salvation Army opened The Church at the Crossroads on the Abbotts Road estate in 2015.

Brayton has St Wilfrid's Anglican Church and the Methodist Chapel and All Saints' Church is in Barlby.

Selby Churches Together set up and run the Selby and District Food Bank.

Economy
Much of the historical wealth of the town is based upon its position upon the banks of the tidal River Ouse. In the past, Selby had a large shipbuilding industry and was an important port, due to the Selby Canal which brought trade from Leeds. The Selby Canal links the River Ouse at Selby, to the River Aire at Haddlesey. The replacement Greenpeace craft (1989 – 2011), bearing the name Rainbow Warrior was built in Selby in 1957 as a fishing boat.
Selby's location allowed vessels to be launched into the river. This often required the more unusual technique of launching the vessels side-on into the river due to lack of space for a more conventional stern first or bow first launch.  One famous vessel of the Cochrane and Son's shipyard of the town is the preserved trawler Ross Tiger at Grimsby's National Fishing Heritage Centre. Cochrane launched their last vessel into the Ouse in 1998, a historical occasion which people around the area went to see. Once Cochrane had closed, the massive cranes still stood over the skyline of Selby until 2001, when seriously strong winds blew them down. Most of the shipyard buildings are still standing (as of February 2014) and the site along with interviews with former employees and archive film was featured in a 2013 video production 'Cochranes of Selby'. The site of the shipyard is currently home to many small businesses who work in the same buildings that were once used to build the Selby ships.

For a time, Selby was the leading coal mining area in the UK and featured some of the most advanced mining technology in Europe. It was the first new mine in the UK for decades and seen as a rejoinder to widespread concern that the British mining industry was effectively shutting down, particularly following the defeat of the 1984–85 miners' strike.

Wistow Colliery, which was part of the Selby Coalfield, holds the UK record for coal mined in one week—200,743 tonnes in 1995. The  Selby Complex, employing 3,000 miners plus contractors and ancillary staff, closed on Friday 14 May 2004 despite rising demand for coal in the UK. UK Coal, the pit's owner, said closure was due to rising costs caused by deteriorating geological conditions and the falling price of coal. In its final years, the company listed a £30 million loss on the plant.

Although much of the infrastructure of the shipbuilding and coal mining industries remain both in and around Selby, both industries have long since been defunct. Present day, the main income for the area is derived from arable farming and as a commuter area for Leeds, Wakefield and York.

In recent years, Selby has seen the development of new shopping areas both in the town centre and on the outskirts. The Abbey Walk Shopping Centre was developed on recreational land that runs parallel to the town centre. The expansion not only increased the volume of town centre shops but also provided large scale, convenient parking for the town centre. In more recent years, the Three Lakes Retail Park has opened on the outskirts of town and continues to expand with more developments under construction. Two of the town's supermarkets, Tesco and Morrisons are both looking to expand their stores, the latter meaning the re-siting of the Abbey Primary School.

On 14 September 2005, Selby District Council was conditionally granted outline planning permission for a state of the art science facility to be built on the site of Burn Gliding Club but these plans did not come to fruition.

Transport

Selby is the transport hub for the local area and has a bus and railway station running services to many places around the area. Train services from Selby railway station run directly to London King's Cross, Leeds, Manchester Piccadilly, York, Hull and other destinations.
Arriva Yorkshire have a bus depot in Selby, from where they offer a range of local services, as well as longer services to Goole, Doncaster, Leeds, Pontefract, Wakefield and York. Thornes Independent of Hemingbrough also offer a range of services in the area.

Bypass

In July 2001 construction began on the Selby bypass which was authorised for development in 1993. The bypass runs from the A19 at Barlby along the southern perimeter of Selby, joining the A63 at Thorpe Willoughby. The project was delayed due to technical difficulties with the swing bridge over the River Ouse but was eventually completed in July 2004.

Culture and sport
Selby Town Hall has been running a music venue since 2003, with regular performances of music, dance, drama and comedy and local band nights, with an annual Battle Of The Bands final, which in 2009 sold out in 12 hours, seeing local band Leonard's Revenge crowned victors.

There have been four cinemas in Selby with the last one closing in the early 1980s. In 2009 a community group established a cinema project called Selby Globe. The group are also working with local community groups in securing the Abbot's Staith, a 15th-century warehouse, a property currently on English Heritage's At Risk Register, it is anticipated that the development of the Abbot's Staith could offer opportunities for social, educational, historical and economic solutions for the town, whilst also promoting tourism.

Selby's major sporting team is Selby Town F.C. ('the Robins'), playing in the Northern Counties East Division One and based at the Flaxley Road Stadium. As a result of a sponsorship deal by a local business, the stadium is now known as the "Fairfax Plant Hire Stadium". The club was founded in 1919, and their most successful season was perhaps the 1953/54 season when they won the Yorkshire Football League and reached the 1st Round of the FA Cup – meeting Bradford Park Avenue and getting their highest ever attendance of 7,000 fans.

A Rugby union club, Selby RUFC, is based at Sandhill Lane Stadium. Sandhill Lane Stadium is currently undergoing construction work to create a new seating stand overlooking the first team pitch, as well as a gym and new changing rooms being added to the members' bar and club bar that's already in place. Selby RUFC have five open age teams, and have veteran and junior set-ups too. Selby 1st are currently in Yorkshire League Division One. In the season 2008–09 Selby U10s won the Gullivers Plate down at Twickenham, The U16s got to the final of the Yorkshire Bowl and Selby 3rds also reached a North Yorkshire final. Selby also has a rugby league club, Selby Warriors based at The Rigid Containers Sports Ground, Foxhill Lane and the Selby Rugby League Referees Society.

Selby Cricket Club which shares Sandhill Lane Stadium has four senior league teams, with the 1st and 2nd XI playing in the York and District Senior League, the 1st XI in Division 4 and the 2nd XI in Division 5. Also the 3rd XI play in Division 4 and 4th XI play in Division 5 of the York Vale League. The team runs two junior teams the under 11s and 15s which both play in the York and District Junior League and also an evening league team in the Howdenshire Evening League (West Division).

Selby and District Motor Club has its own clubhouse at Breighton Airfield on Sand Lane. Meeting on Tuesday evenings, its members participate in Road Rallies, Stage Rallies, Sprints, Autotests and Production Car Trials. Members discuss motor sporting events and regularly show videos. The club has organised an annual Road Rally called the Three Swans Rally, based on local roads and forming a major part of local championships.

Media
Selby's longest established newspaper title is the Selby Times, owned and published by Chronicle Publications along with its sister paper the Goole Times. The company previously owned the Selby Post and purchased the title from Johnston Press when they ceased publication of the paper in August 2013. Published weekly, the paper costs 60p. The paper covers the Selby district, including the town centre and villages such as Sherburn-in-Elmet, and as far as Tadcaster.

In 2014, despite the shift to online news, The Goole and Selby Times together were only part of three newspapers in the country to actually increase print sales. The Goole Times (incorporating the Selby Times) saw a rise of more than three quarters to 15,045 compared to the same period in 2013.

The Goole Times and Selby Times received an unprecedented 1,000 toys for their annual Christmas toy appeal in December 2017.

In 2019, The Selby Chronicle was relaunched as an online-only newspaper.

Twin towns
Selby is twinned with:

 Carentan, France
 Filderstadt, Germany

Notable people

Harold Brigham, footballer
Nigel Adams, Member of Parliament, Selby and Ainsty (UK Parliament constituency) and Minister of State for Asia
Robert Aske, rebel leader, lawyer
Tommy Cannon, entertainer
Robert of Selby, courtier, chancellor of Sicily
Jack Byers, footballer
Gavin Harding MBE, first person with learning disability to become mayor in United Kingdom
Henry I of England, king of England
Arthur Hinsley, Roman Catholic cardinal, archbishop
Jonathan Hutchinson, surgeon, dermatologist
Woods Hutchinson, physician, writer

Thomas Johnson, botanist
Keith Kelly, pop singer
Bill Nelson, singer, songwriter
John Sherwood, Olympic athlete
Steve Sherwood, footballer
James Stephenson, actor
Eden Taylor-Draper, actress
Smithson Tennant, chemist, discoverer
Matthew Warchus, theatre and film director
Leigh Wood, footballer

See also
Selby and District DIAL
Selby College
Selby High School

References

External links

Selby Times
Selby Town Council
Selby Globe Community Cinema
Selby Town Hall Events
Online Map-Based record of Selby's History
Selby Chamber
The Riverside Live Music Venue

 
Towns in North Yorkshire
Civil parishes in North Yorkshire
Populated places established in the 1st millennium